The 152. Fighter Escadrille was a unit of the Polish Air Force at the start of the Second World War. In 1939 the unit was attached to the Modlin Army.

Equipment
9 PZL P.11c and 1 PZL P.11a airplanes.

Air Crew
Commanding officer: kpt. pil. Włodzimierz Łazoryk

Deputy Commander: por.pil.Marian Imiela

Pilots:
 ppor.pil.Jan Bury-Burzymski
 ppor.pil.Anatol Piotrowski
 pchor.pil.Mieczysław Babiański
 pchor.pil.Stanisław Kędzierski
 pchor.pil.Mieczysław Waszkiewicz
 plut.pil.Marian Bełc
 kpr.pil.Stanisław Brzeski
 kpr.pil.Antoni Joda
 kpr.pil.Aleksander Popławski
 st.szer.pil.Mieczysław Popek

See also
Polish Air Force order of battle in 1939

References
 

Polish Air Force escadrilles